Dirty Laundry is the eighth solo album of Ian Hunter. This album was actually not planned, because Hunter only intended to record a few songs at Abbey Road Studios. However, twelve tracks were recorded in a fortnight.

The project started out with Norwegian keyboardist Casino Steel, formerly of Hollywood Brats, inviting Hunter to sit in the studio and marked the return of Hunter to the studio since the death of his long-time friend and collaborator Mick Ronson. Darrell Bath and "Honest" John Plain were formerly in the Crybabys and "Vom" was ex-Doctor and the Medics.
Unlike his previous solo albums, many songs were written or co-written by others. The album came out with little fanfare in 1995 on a small Norwegian label, with the US company, Cleveland International, also picking it up.

Track listing
"Dancing on the Moon" (Hunter, Bath, Plain) – 5:24
"Another Fine Mess" (Hunter, Bath, Plain) – 3:28
"Scars" (Hunter, Bath, Plain) – 5:04
"Never Trust a Blonde" (Bath) – 5:19
"Psycho Girl" (Plain) – 2:48
"My Revolution" (Steel, Matt Dangerfield, Hunter) – 4:08
"Good Girls" (Plain) – 4:01
"Red Letter Day" (Hunter) – 5:11
"Invisible Strings" (Hunter) – 3:53
"Everyone's a Fool" (Bath, Roig) – 2:41
"Junkee Love" (Andrew Matheson, Steel) – 2:46
"The Other Man" (Hunter) – 5:23

Personnel
Ian Hunter - guitars, vocals
Casino Steel (Stein Groven) - keyboards, vocals, percussion
"Honest" John Plain (John Splain) - guitar, vocals
Darrell Bath - guitar, vocals
Glen Matlock - bass
Steve "Vom" Ritchie - drums
Blue Weaver - keyboards
Lasse Hafreager - piano, organ
Mitt Gamon - harmonica
Angela Clemmons-Patrick, Bård Svendsen, James Williams, Torstein Flakne, Vaneese Thomas - backing vocals
Torstein Flakne - guitar on "Invisible Strings"
Technical
Rune Nordal - technician
Wolfgang Guerster - photography

References

1995 albums
Ian Hunter (singer) albums
Cherry Red Records albums